Johannes Paul "Whitey" Dienelt (April 28, 1921 – January 12, 1990) was an American professional basketball player. He played for the Fort Wayne Zollner Pistons in the National Basketball League for 13 games during the 1946–47 season and averaged 0.8 points per game.

References

1921 births
1990 deaths
American men's basketball players
Basketball players from Indiana
Fort Wayne Zollner Pistons players
Guards (basketball)
People from the Free City of Danzig
People from New Haven, Indiana
Danzig emigrants to the United States